Big Time Rush is an American pop music boy band formed in 2009. The group is composed of Kendall Schmidt, James Maslow, Logan Henderson, and Carlos PenaVega. They initially signed with Nick Records in 2009 and then transferred to Columbia Records. The group starred in Nickelodeon's television series of the same name, Big Time Rush. The show ran from November 28, 2009, to July 25, 2013. The pilot episode featured the group's first promotional single, "Big Time Rush". The group has released three studio albums: BTR in 2010, Elevate in 2011, and 24/Seven in 2013. The band went on an indefinite hiatus in 2014 that lasted until 2021 when the group resumed live performances and released the single "Call It Like I See It".

Career

2009–2010: Formation and BTR
Nickelodeon signed Big Time Rush to a record deal in 2009 simultaneously with the television series, Big Time Rush. Then, Nickelodeon partnered with Columbia/Epic Label Group to produce the show and include the original music to the show. For the series, their debut single, "Big Time Rush", was released on November 29, 2009. Officially announced by Nickelodeon, the series was first broadcast in the U.S. in November 2009, until it was eventually released worldwide. It debuted during a one-hour special preview of the series and it is currently the show's opening theme. The series also saw the releases of promotional singles including "City is Ours" and "Any Kind of Guy". Big Time Rush also covered a Play song titled "Famous". The song was released on iTunes on June 29, 2010. Another song, "Halfway There", was released to iTunes on April 27, 2010, after its premiere on the series. It soon became their first song to chart on the Billboard Hot 100, peaking at number 93 due to digital sales.

On September 21, 2010, Big Time Rush released second single, "Till I Forget About You", to promote the release of their debut album. The album, titled BTR, was released on October 11, 2010. The album debuted at number 3 on the Billboard 200, selling 67,000 copies in its first week of release. The album also peaked at number 4 on the Internet Albums chart and number one on the Soundtracks chart. Its track "Big Night" debuted on the Billboard Hot 100 at number 79, making it their highest-peaking song. The album was later certified Gold for sales of over 500,000 copies in the U.S. In November 2010, it was announced that a Christmas special of Big Time Rush would debut later that month, and that a Christmas EP would be released to coincide with the episode. On November 30, 2010, they released the Holiday EP Holiday Bundle, with two songs: "Beautiful Christmas" and the cover of "All I Want for Christmas", originally performed by Mariah Carey.

On February 15, 2011, "Boyfriend" was released as the band's third official single to mainstream U.S. radio. "Boyfriend" peaked at number seventy-two on the Billboard Hot 100, becoming their most successful song to date. It even peaked at number 30 on the Billboard Pop Songs chart in March 2011 and also charted very well in multiple international countries. A remix of "Boyfriend" which featured New Boyz was leaked onto the internet. Big Time Rush was nominated for MTV's Breakthrough Band award honor in 2011 as well. Big Time Rush has made several appearances at Kid's Choice Awards. Their single "Boyfriend" was nominated for a Premios Oye! award in Mexico (similar to the Grammy Award in the United States) for Best International English Song of the Year. They lost to Rihanna's single "Diamonds".

2011–2012: Elevate and film

The group announced they would be recording their second studio album, just after Nickelodeon renewed the series for a third season. On July 22, 2011, the group released a promotional single, "If I Ruled the World" featuring Iyaz, in anticipation of their second album, Elevate. Elevate was released on November 21, 2011, and debuted at number 12 on the Billboard 200, selling over 70,000 copies in its first week. Though the album had a lower peak position than their previous debut, Elevate sold far more copies its first week respectively than the previous album did. The first single, "Music Sounds Better with U", written by the band and Ryan Tedder from OneRepublic, was released on November 1, 2011. The song peaked at number twenty-six on the U.S. Mainstream Top 40. The second and last single, "Windows Down", was released on June 25, 2012, and peaked at number ninety-seven on the Billboard Hot 100 and at number thirty-five on the Mainstream Top 40, making their third top forty entrance in the chart.

To promote the release of their second album, the group had their first headlining tour, the Better With U Tour, which took place over sixteen dates in several big cities in North America in February and March 2012. JoJo opened for Big Time Rush for the first five dates, while One Direction opened for ten of the sixteen dates. In late February, Big Time Rush announced a national summer tour starting July 5 at the Nationwide Arena in Columbus, OH.

The group announced they would be starring in their full-length 2012 film, Big Time Movie. The movie features them traveling to London, England. In Big Time Movie, the four members of the group Big Time Rush head to London for their first big world tour but instead get mixed up in a mission to save the world. The film was released on March 10, 2012, in the U.S. to theaters, while a Germany release was on September 22, 2012. Due to the promotion, the group recorded cover of the Beatles songs and released an EP, Big Time Movie Soundtrack EP. The film received mixed to positive reviews from most contemporary film critics, many comparing them to The Monkees and praising their fun, carefree image. The film was a ratings success, having over thirteen million views during its premiere weekend.

2013–2014: 24/Seven

In 2013 Nickelodeon renewed the Big Time Rush series for a 13-episode fourth season, production started on January 7. The band also released a song titled "Like Nobody's Around" which according to the premiere episode "Big Time Invasion" was outlining the history of professional, successful, and all-American boy bands; the Platters, the Temptations, the Jackson 5, New Kids on the Block, Backstreet Boys, and NSYNC, in response to the British invasion of rival act, and hugely successful One Direction. On April 15, in an interview on Cambio, Big Time Rush announced that their third studio album, 24/Seven would be released sometime in early June 2013 and that the fourth season of Big Time Rush was set to premiere on May 2, 2013. On April 18, Big Time Rush revealed that 24/Seven would be released on either June 4 or 11, 2013. On April 20, nine tracks from the album (plus "Song for You" without the Karmin vocals and "Get Up" with only Schmidt's vocals) were leaked. On June 4, EW released the full 10-song Standard version of 24/Seven online. The Deluxe version of 24/Seven also leaked on YouTube along with a different version of the track "Love Me Again".

24/Seven was released on June 11, 2013, the album cover and track list were revealed on April 29, 2013. 24/Seven was less commercially successful than Elevate. It included songs such as the up-tempo title track "24/Seven" and the rock ballad "We Are". Big Time Rush were still nominated for World's Best Group, Best Album and Best Live Act for the ceremony in Monte Carlo, Monaco at the Salle des Etoiles Venue for the 22nd annual World Music Awards for their continuing global success with the band and their 24/Seven release. It was later confirmed that same night after the awards show that Big Time Rush had won the World's Best Live Act trophy, making them the very first and only Nickelodeon act and/or artist in history to win a World Music Award trophy.

In 2013, after the end of the run of the Big Time Rush television series, the group members continued touring until March 2014 and later put the band on an indefinite hiatus, and went on to pursue solo careers. Schmidt stated at that time that they would like to come back together again as a band if they have an opportunity. Kendall Schmidt later reformed the band Heffron Drive with Dustin Belt In May 2013.

2020–present: Reunion
On April 20, 2020, the band reunited virtually, as they uploaded a video on the band's social media platforms, sharing some wishes to their fans about the COVID-19 pandemic. On June 16, the band released an acoustic cover of "Worldwide". In December 2020, member James Maslow uploaded a video of the band performing their song "Beautiful Christmas" via YouTube.

On July 19, 2021, the group released a video announcing reunion performances which occurred in December 2021.

The group released the single "Call It Like I See It" on December 13, 2021, marking the group's first release since  2013.

On February 21, 2022, the band announced on Good Morning America that they would be holding a reunion tour throughout 2022. On February 25, the band released another single called "Not Giving You Up."

Artistry

Musical style and themes
Because the group is associated with the TV series and children's network Nickelodeon, they have been presented as a "child-friendly" group, but have musical differences. In a review of their first studio album, BTR, Jessica Dawson from Common Sense Media wrote: "Big Time Rush is a standout, not only because of their boyish charm and good looks, but because their music is a cool blend of synth-pop, hip-hop, and boy-band harmonies." The sound of the band is described as "pop-inspired dance-rock".

Public image

The group has been compared to other boy bands of the time such as One Direction and the Wanted. Michael O'Connell from The Hollywood Reporter said "One Direction is but one group in this resilient and timeless fad. They follow the recent success of fellow Brits [the Wanted] and Nickelodeon's cross-market creation [Big Time Rush]. One [One Direction] is fluke. Two [the Wanted] is a coincidence. And three [Big Time Rush] is a trend that you want to father your unborn children.' Melinda Newman from The Washington Post stated "In the grand tradition of boy bands, these acts share certain traits with their similarly manufactured pop ancestors: Members of the Wanted and Big Time Rush auditioned for their parts at a casting call. The members of One Direction were put together by Simon Cowell after trying out individually for the British edition of The X Factor." However, she positively compared them to the Monkees by saying "Big Time Rush is similar to the Monkees with its own TV series as a launchpad, and the group appeals to kids, tweens, teens, and adults. They are also credited as the pop group that have once again restored creditably, relevance, and for relaunching boy bands back into the public eye once again."

In Parades 2012 poll, Big Time Rush was voted the "Best Boy Band in the World", topping both One Direction and the Wanted. Over 800,000 votes were cast. The band was featured on the cover of the August 5, 2012 issue of Parade which was a national top seller. An interview and photo set highlighting the group's win that coincided with the honor was featured in the same issue. The magazine's website also featured the group amongst its list of "Greatest Boy Bands of All-Time", along with NSYNC and the Backstreet Boys. Big Time Rush have been honored and recognized multiple times by major media outlets throughout their time as a group. Due to their extreme worldwide popularity and success (along with being heavily credited as one of the bands that helped bring back the boy band wave) the Washington Times Magazine ranked Big Time Rush Number 15 of their Top 20 Best Boy Bands of the decade in 2012. And number 28 on the POP! Goes The Charts website list of the Top 40 Best Boy Bands of the past 25 years in 2013. To Toronto Sun, PenaVega talked about the group's impact on both music and television: "I think the music could stand alone, but I don't know if it would be as powerful. The show has definitely been our main audience. We have four million kids watching. So when you put a song out, four million kids hear it. When you put a song on the radio, you're not going to have four million people listening. It's a blessing and a curse being on Nickelodeon – it's gotten us where we are now, though some people are standoffish to us because of that. But we have to be grateful that Nickelodeon gave us this opportunity. Abandoning the show would not be the best idea".

Members
Kendall Schmidt – vocals, acoustic guitar
James Maslow – vocals, piano
Carlos PenaVega – vocals 
Logan Henderson – vocals

Discography

 BTR (2010)
 Elevate (2011)
 24/Seven (2013)

Tours

Headlining
Big Time Rush in Concert (2011)
Better with U Tour (2012)
Big Time Summer Tour (2012)
Summer Break Tour (2013)
Live World Tour (2014)
 Forever Tour (2022 - 2023)
 Can't Get Enough Tour (2023)

Concert Shows
 Big Time Rush Live (2021)

Awards and nominations

References

External links
 Official site 
 
 Big Time Rush on MTV.com

 
Rock music groups from California
American pop music groups
American contemporary R&B musical groups
American boy bands
Fictional musical groups
Musical groups established in 2009
Musical groups disestablished in 2014
Musical quartets
Columbia Records artists
2009 establishments in California
World Music Awards winners
Musical groups reestablished in 2021